James Husey-Hunt (20 April 1853 – 13 May 1924) was an English cricketer. He played for Gloucestershire between 1878 and 1880.

References

1853 births
1924 deaths
English cricketers
Gloucestershire cricketers
Cricketers from Somerset
Marylebone Cricket Club cricketers